The Sweetest Mango is a 2001 romantic comedy film, the first feature film produced in Antigua and Barbuda. It was directed by Howard Allen. Howard and Mitzi Allen were co-executive producers, and Joanne C. Hillhouse served as associate producer. The film was inspired by the real-life story of Howard and Mitzi Allen and written by D. Gisele Isaac. The film was intended as "millennium Project", marking the entry of the island country to the 21st century and the 3rd millennium. Actress Janil Greenaway would later serve as consul general of Antigua and Barbuda to Canada.

Plot 
The film's plot about the way "a couple met and fell in love", is reportedly based on real events. Film critic Anne Brodie cited the setting of the film in its native island country as helping it in managing to reflect "local life, climate and colour". She also found the "human scale and intimacy" of the relationship rather unusual for recent romance films. The story starts with Lovelyanne ‘Luv' Davies returning to her native Antigua after an extensive stay in Canada. She struggles to re-adjust herself to life on a relatively small island. The turmoil of her personal and professional life is further complicated by her involvement in a love triangle.

Legacy 
A decade after its release, Brodie donated her copy of the film to the Bell Lightbox Film Reference Library. The Library and its contents are available to the public, and she hoped that the film may be seen by a new audience.

Cast
Jermilla Kirwan as Lovelyanne Davies
Omar Mathurin
Janil Greenaway
Julie Hewlett
Mervyn Richards
Berni Isaac
Centelia Browne
Denise Francis 		
Heather Doram

References

External links
The Sweetest Mango at IMDb

2001 films
2001 romantic comedy films
Films set in Antigua and Barbuda
Films shot in Antigua and Barbuda
Antigua and Barbuda films
2000s English-language films